This is a list of episodes for the television series Daniel Boone.

Series overview

Episodes

Season 1 (1964–1965)

Season 2 (1965–1966)

Season 3 (1966–1967)
Veronica Cartwright no longer appeared in the show as Jemima Boone (from some reports at the insistence of Patricia Blair)

Season 4 (1967–1968)

Season 5 (1968–1969)
Ed Ames no longer appeared in seasons 5 and 6.

Season 6 (1969–1970)

References

 
 

Daniel Boone
Lists of American Western (genre) television series episodes